Ivyland Historic District is a national historic district located at Ivyland, Bucks County, Pennsylvania.  The district includes 133 contributing buildings in the borough of Ivyland. It is a primarily residential district, with a number of buildings representative of Late Victorian styles. They date between 1873 and 1931 and reflect Ivyland's development as a planned railroad suburb. The majority of the residential buildings are 2 1/2-story, frame structures with gable roofs, front porches, and irregular plans.  One notable non-residential building is "The Temperance House" hotel (c. 1875).

It was added to the National Register of Historic Places in 2002.

References

Historic districts in Bucks County, Pennsylvania
Victorian architecture in Pennsylvania
Historic districts on the National Register of Historic Places in Pennsylvania
National Register of Historic Places in Bucks County, Pennsylvania